The Phenom is a 2016 American sports drama film written and directed by Noah Buschel, starring Johnny Simmons, Paul Giamatti, and Ethan Hawke. The film was released on June 24, 2016, by RLJ Entertainment, and is loosely based on the early life and professional struggles of former Major League Baseball player Rick Ankiel.

Plot
A talented young pitcher struggles to throw strikes. The major league club sends him to a sports psychologist, where memories of his abusive father come to light.

Cast
 Johnny Simmons as Hopper Gibson
 Ethan Hawke as Hopper Gibson Sr.
 Paul Giamatti as Dr. Mobley
 Yul Vazquez as Eddie Soler
 Sophie Kennedy Clark as Dorothy Boyer
 Marin Ireland as Rachel Cullum
 Elizabeth Marvel as June Epland
 Louisa Krause as Candace Cassidy
 Alison Elliott as Susan Gibson
 Paul Adelstein as Scott Borwitz

Production
The Phenom was shot primarily in Atlanta, Georgia. Principal photography wrapped on December 20, 2014. Hawke had previously considered taking a part in Buschel's second film, 2007's Neal Cassady, and the two became friendly after that.

Critical reception
On the film-review aggregator Rotten Tomatoes, the film has an approval rating of 79% based on 47 reviews, with an average rating of 6.50/10. The site's consensus is, "Powerfully acted and emotionally affecting, The Phenom proves a baseball movie can step away from the mound and still deliver a heater down the middle." On Metacritic, the film holds a score of 66 out of 100 based on reviews from 15 critics, indicating "generally favorable reviews".

The Village Voice said, "The Phenom is the baseball movie Robert Altman never made. Simmons is a wonder." The Hollywood Reporter described the film as "suffused with insight and intelligence," adding, "the film is another noteworthy effort from the writer/director of such intriguing if unfortunately little-seen dramas as Glass Chin and Sparrows Dance." The Los Angeles Times called it "an unusual and affecting baseball drama where nearly all the action is internal." Kyle Smith of the New York Post wrote, "Don't let its restraint fool you: As unshowy as it is, The Phenom has an impressive collection of tools." Matt Prigge of Metro New York wrote that "Noah Buschel might be one of indies' most interesting filmmakers, all the more so because he doesn't belong to any easily promotable group or even genre." Nick Allen of RogerEbert.com wrote, "A welcome surprise for sports cinema.". Ethan Sacks of New York Daily News noted "Every once in a while an indie drama actually throws a curve... The Phenom is a "W" for writer-director Noah Buschel... Johnny Simmons' Hopper Jr. has been taught to never show emotion on the mound. Save some of that for the people in the audience." Neil Genzlinger of The New York Times wrote, "It's a variation of all those children's movies and TV shows in which a Little Leaguer or pee-wee football player is browbeaten by a parent trying to relive his or her own childhood. The director and writer, Noah Buschel, has no fresh insights to add to the well-worn dynamic and doesn't give the actors or audience much to work with."

Release
The film premiered at the Tribeca Film Festival on April 17, 2016. The film was released on June 24, 2016, by RLJ Entertainment.

References

External links

2016 films
2010s sports drama films
American sports drama films
American baseball films
Films shot in Atlanta
2016 drama films
2010s English-language films
Films directed by Noah Buschel
2010s American films